The National Library of Israel (NLI;), formerly Jewish National and University Library (JNUL), is the library dedicated to collecting the cultural treasures of Israel and of Jewish heritage. The library holds more than 5 million books, and is located on the Givat Ram campus of the Hebrew University of Jerusalem (HUJI).

The National Library owns the world's largest collections of Hebraica and Judaica, and is the repository of many rare and unique manuscripts, books and artifacts.

History

B'nai Brith library (1892–1925)

The establishment of a Jewish National Library in Jerusalem was the brainchild of Joseph Chazanovitz (1844–1919). His idea was creating a "home for all works in all languages and literatures which have Jewish authors, even though they create in foreign cultures." Chazanovitz collected some 15,000 volumes which later became the core of the library.

The B'nai Brith library, founded in Jerusalem in 1892, was the first public library in Palestine to serve the Jewish community. The library was located on B'nai Brith street, between the Meah Shearim neighborhood and the Russian Compound. Ten years later, the Bet Midrash Abrabanel library, as it was then known, moved to Ethiopia Street.

Hebrew University library (1925–2007)

In 1920, when plans were drawn up for the Hebrew University, the B'nai Brith collection became the basis for a university library. The books were moved to Mount Scopus when the university opened five years later.

In 1948, when access to the university campus on Mount Scopus was blocked, most of the books were moved to the university's temporary quarters in the Terra Sancta building in Rehavia. By that time, the university collection included over one million books. For lack of space, some of the books were placed in storerooms around the city. In 1960, they were moved to the new JNUL building in Givat Ram.

In the late 1970s, when the new university complex on Mount Scopus was inaugurated and the faculties of Law, Humanities and Social Science returned there, departmental libraries opened on that campus and the number of visitors to the Givat Ram library dropped. In the 1990s, the building suffered from maintenance problems such as rainwater leaks and insect infestation.

National Library legal status (2007)
In 2007 the library was officially recognized as The National Library of the State of Israel after the passage of the National Library Law. The law, which came into effect on 23 July 2008, changed the library's name to "National Library of Israel" and turned it temporarily to a subsidiary company of the University, later to become a fully independent community interest company, jointly owned by the Government of Israel (50%), the Hebrew University (25%) and other organizations.

New building
In 2014, the project for a new home of the Library in Jerusalem was unveiled. The 34,000 square meters building, designed by the Basel-based architecture firm Herzog & de Meuron, the full completion was scheduled for 2021, and is currently expected to take place on mid-2023.

Temporary closure (2020)
In August, 2020, the National Library announced its immediately forthcoming closure "until further notice" due to the ongoing financial and government crisis. The closure lasted for two weeks and the Library subsequently re-opened.

Goals and objectives

The library's mission is to secure copies of all material published in Israel, in any language; all publications on the subject of Israel, the Land of Israel, Judaism and the Jewish people, published in any language, in any country in the world; and all material published in Hebrew or any of the languages spoken in the Jewish Diaspora (such as Yiddish and Ladino).

By law, two copies of all printed matter published in Israel must be deposited in the National Library. In 2001, the law was amended to include audio and video recordings, and other non-print media. Many manuscripts, including some of the library's unique volumes such the 13th century Worms Mahzor, have been scanned and are available on the library's website. Due to be completed in 2023, the National Library of Israel is digitizing over 2,500 rare manuscripts and books which will be available online for free. The works are written in Arabic, Persian, Turkish and Urdu and date from the 9th to 20th Centuries.

Special collections

Among the library's special collections are the personal papers of hundreds of outstanding Jewish figures, the National Sound Archives, the Eran Laor Cartographic Collection, The Sidney Edelstein Collection (for the history of science) and numerous other collections of Hebraica and Judaica. The library also possesses some of Isaac Newton's manuscripts dealing with theological subjects. The collection, donated by the family of the collector Abraham Yahuda, includes many works by Newton about mysticism, analyses of holy books, predictions about the end of days and the appearance of the ancient Temple in Jerusalem. It also contains maps that Newton sketched about mythical events to assist him in his end of days calculations. The library houses the personal archives of Martin Buber and Gershom Scholem. Additionally the library houses the Gershom Scholem Collection for the Research of Kabbalah and Hasidism, including Scholem′s personal library and items added since his death in 1982.

Following the occupation of West Jerusalem by Haganah forces in May 1948, the libraries of a number Palestinians who fled the country as well as of other well-to-do Palestinians were transferred to the National Library. These collections included those of Henry Cattan, Khalil Beidas, Khalil al-Sakakini and Aref Hikmet Nashashibi. About 30,000 books were removed from homes in West Jerusalem, with another 40,000 taken from other cities in Mandatory Palestine. It is unclear whether the books were being kept and protected or if they were looted from the abandoned houses of their owners. About 6,000 of these books are in the library today indexed with the label AP – "Abandoned Property". The books are cataloged, can be viewed from the Library's general catalog and are regularly consulted by the public.

The National Library of Israel completed its collection of the Max Brod archive in August 2019.

On 19 December 2022, Irishman Stuart Rosenblatt, President of the Genealogical Society of Ireland, will donate his 22 volume collection, being the Genealogical History of the Irish Jewish Communities, to the National Library of Israel, in the presence of the Irish Ambassador to Israel.

See also
Judaica Archival Project
List of national and state libraries
Names, Not Numbers, holocaust documentary film project
Union List of Israel, combined library catalog with over 5 million entries

References

External links

 
 

 
1892 establishments in Ottoman Syria
Academic libraries in Israel
Archives in Israel
Deposit libraries
Government buildings in Israel
Hebrew University of Jerusalem
Libraries established in 1892
Libraries in Jerusalem
Israel
Organizations based in Jerusalem
Public libraries
World Digital Library partners